Bubonicon is an annual multigenre convention in Albuquerque, New Mexico, typically held during the last weekend of August. It is the largest general-interest science fiction convention in New Mexico and among the oldest in the Southwest.

History
Bubonicon was first held in 1969 as a literary science fiction gathering in Albuquerque called NewMexiCon. Authors Roy Tackett and Robert E. Vardeman were two of the key figures in establishing and promoting Bubonicon in its early days. From a gathering of 20 in 1969, Bubonicon grew quickly with roughly fifty people attending in 1971 and over one hundred people attending Bubonicon 5 in 1973. 1973 also introduced Bubonicon's mascot, Perry Rhodent. The name Bubonicon, not officially adopted until 1971, is a nod to Albuquerque's long history of bubonic plague outbreaks, with Perry Rhodent a continuation of this theme.

In 1976 one of Bubonicon's longest running traditions, the Green Slime Awards, were started in order to honor the worst in Science Fiction from the previous year. This reflected the growth of the convention over the years from largely a literary gathering to one which now included science speakers, often from nearby Sandia National Laboratories and the University of New Mexico giving lectures on everything from physics to microbiology, and  encompassed fiction and fantasy of all media.

In the 1990s, Bubonicon averaged three hundred people in attendance and 2003's gathering marked the first time which over four hundred people from all over the United States were making the trek to attend, as well as international guests. Recent conventions average around 500 people in attendance.  Bubonicon 42, held in 2010 at the Albuquerque Grand Airport Hotel, featured a theme based on Douglas Adams' The Hitchhiker's Guide to the Galaxy. Honored guests included authors Peter David and Mario Acevedo.

In 2012, Bubonicon attendance surged to over 700, at the new larger venue, Marriott Hotel, at Louisiana and I40.  The theme was based on the Mayan Apocalypse idea of the "End of the World as We Know It."

Upcoming for 2018 is the 50th anniversary of the event, with the "Golden Age of Science Fiction" theme.  Please refer to bubonicon.com for current information.  Attendance has reached approximately 950 at least once since 2012, with attendees usually numbering between 750-850.

References

External links
 Bubonicon official website

Science fiction conventions in the United States
Recurring events established in 1969
Culture of Albuquerque, New Mexico
1969 establishments in New Mexico
Conventions in New Mexico